The mancala games are a family of two-player turn-based strategy board games played with small stones, beans, or seeds and rows of holes or pits in the earth, a board or other playing surface.  The objective is usually to capture all or some set of the opponent's pieces.

Versions of the game date back past the 3rd century and evidence suggests the game existed in Ancient Egypt. It is among the oldest known games to still be widely played today.

Names and variants

The name is a classification or type of game, rather than any specific game. Some of the most popular mancala games (concerning distribution area, the numbers of players and  tournaments, and publications) are:
 Ayoayo,  played by the Yoruba people in Nigeria; similar to Oware.
 Alemungula or gebeta (ገበጣ)– played in Sudan and Ethiopia.
 Ali Guli Mane or Pallanguzhi – played in Southern India.
 Bao la Kiswahili or Ajua – played in most of East Africa including Kenya, Tanzania, Comoros, Malawi, as well as some areas of DR Congo, Uganda and Burundi.
 Congklak (a.k.a. congkak, congka, tjongklak, jongklak) – played in Malay Archipelago by Malay (i.e. Malay people).
 Dakon (or ) – played in Indonesian archipelago (especially in Java island).
 Gebeta (Tigrinya: ገበጣ) – Ethiopian and Eritrea (especially in Tigray).
 Hoyito – played in the Dominican Republic.
 Igisoro - played in Rwanda.
 Kalah – North American variation, the most popular variant in the Western world.
 Lamlameta – played in Ethiopia. 
 Ô ăn quan - played in Vietnam. 
 Ohvalhugondi - played in the Maldives.
 Omanu Guntalu (in Telugu) – played in rural areas of Telangana, India.
 Opón ayò – among the Yorubas of Nigeria.
 Oware (awalé, awélé, awari) – Ashanti, but played world-wide with close variants played throughout West Africa (e.g., ayo by Yorubas and ishe by Igalas) and in the Caribbean.
 Pallanguzhi - played in Tamil Nadu, India.
 Sungka – It was first described by the Jesuit priest Father José Sanchez in his dictionary of the Bisaya language (Cebuano) in a 1692 manuscript as kunggit. Father José Sanchez who had arrived in the Philippines in 1643 wrote that at the game was played with seashells on a wooden, boat-like board. The Aklanon people still call the game kunggit. 
 Toguz korgool or Toguz kumalak – played in Kyrgyzstan and Kazakhstan.
 Vwela – played by the nyemba (lucazi) people distributed between Southern Angola, Northern East Namibia, and Zambia.

They differ from other mancala types in that the player's store is included in the placing of the seeds. The most common type has seven holes for each player, in addition to the player store holes. This version has identical rules throughout its range. But there are also numerous variations with the number of holes and rules by region. Sometimes more than one version can be played in a single locality.

Although more than 800 names of traditional mancala games are known, some names denote the same game, while others are used for more than one game. Almost 200 modern invented versions have also been described.

History

Evidence of the game was uncovered in Israel in the city of Gedera in an excavated Roman bathhouse where pottery boards and rock cuts were unearthed dating back to between the 2nd and 3rd century AD. Among other early evidence of the game are fragments of a pottery board and several rock cuts found in Aksumite areas in Matara (in Eritrea) and Yeha (in Ethiopia), which are dated by archaeologists to between the 6th and 7th centuries AD; the game may have been mentioned by Giyorgis of Segla in his 14th century Geʽez text Mysteries of Heaven and Earth, where he refers to a game called qarqis, a term used in Geʽez to refer to both Gebet'a (mancala) and Sant'araz (modern sent'erazh, Ethiopian chess).

The games existed in especially eastern Europe. In the Balkan area, it was once very popular ("Bohnenspiel"); in Bosnia, where it is called Ban-Ban and still played today; Serbia; and Greece ("Mandoli", Cyclades). Two mancala tables from the early 18th century are to be found in Weikersheim Castle in southern Germany. In western Europe, it never caught on but was documented by Oxford University orientalist Thomas Hyde.

The United States has a larger mancala-playing population. A traditional mancala game called Warra was still played in Louisiana in the early 20th century, and a commercial version called Kalah became popular in the 1940s. In Cape Verde, mancala is known as "ouril". It is played on the Islands and was brought to the United States by Cape Verdean immigrants. It is played to this day in Cape Verdean communities in New England.

Recent studies of mancala rules have given insight into the distribution of mancala. This distribution has been linked to migration routes, which may go back several hundred years.

Etymology 
The word mancala is a tool noun derived from an Arabic root naqala meaning "to move". No one game exists with the name mancala; the name is a classification or type of game. This word is used in Syria, Lebanon, and Egypt but is not consistently applied to any one game; it was applied to backgammon in the ancient Near East. Mancala first appeared in Africa.

General gameplay 
Most mancala games share a common general gameplay. Players begin by placing a certain number of seeds, prescribed for the particular game, in each of the pits on the game board. A player may count their stones to plot the game. A turn consists of removing all seeds from a pit, "sowing" the seeds (placing one in each of the following pits in sequence), and capturing based on the state of the board. The game's object is to plant the most seeds in the bank. This leads to the English phrase "count and capture" sometimes used to describe the gameplay. Although the details differ greatly, this general sequence applies to all games.

If playing in capture mode, once a player ends their turn in an empty pit on their own side, they capture the opponent's pieces directly across. Once captured, the player gets to put the seeds in their own bank. After capturing, the opponent forfeits a turn.

Equipment 
 

Equipment is typically a board, constructed of various materials, with a series of holes arranged in rows, usually two or four. The materials include clay and other shapeable materials. Some games are more often played with holes dug in the earth, or carved in stone. The holes may be referred to as "depressions", "pits", or "houses". Sometimes, large holes on the ends of the board called stores, are used for holding the pieces.

Playing pieces are seeds, beans, stones, cowry shells, half-marbles or other small undifferentiated counters that are placed in and transferred about the holes during play.

Board configurations vary among different games but also within variations of a given game; for example Endodoi is played on boards from 2×6 to 2×10. The largest is Tchouba (Mozambique) with a board of 160 (4×40) holes requiring 320 seeds, and En Gehé (Tanzania), played on longer rows with up to 50 pits (a total of 2×50=100) and using 400 seeds. The most minimalistic variants are Nano-Wari and Micro-Wari, created by the Bulgarian ethnologue Assia Popova. The Nano-Wari board has eight seeds in just two pits; Micro-Wari has a total of four seeds in four pits.

With a two-rank board, players usually are considered to control their respective sides of the board, although moves often are made into the opponent's side. With a four-rank board, players control an inner row and an outer row, and a player's seeds will remain in these closest two rows unless the opponent captures them.

Objective 
The objective of most two- and three-row mancala games is to capture more stones than the opponent; in four-row games, one usually seeks to leave the opponent with no legal move or sometimes to capture all counters in their front row.

At the beginning of a player's turn, they select a hole with seeds that will be sown around the board. This selection is often limited to holes on the current player's side of the board, as well as holes with a certain minimum number of seeds.

In a process known as sowing, all the seeds from a hole are dropped one by one into subsequent holes in a motion wrapping around the board. Sowing is an apt name for this activity, since not only are many games traditionally played with seeds but placing seeds one at a time in different holes reflects the physical act of sowing. If the sowing action stops after dropping the last seed, the game is considered a single lap game.

Multiple laps or relay sowing is a frequent feature of mancala games, although not universal. When relay sowing, if the last seed during sowing lands in an occupied hole, all the contents of that hole, including the last sown seed, are immediately re-sown from the hole. The process usually will continue until sowing ends in an empty hole. Another common way to receive "multiple laps" is when the final seed sown lands in your designated hole.

Many games from the Indian subcontinent use pussakanawa laps. These are like standard multi-laps, but instead of continuing the movement with the contents of the last hole filled, a player continues with the next hole. A pussakanawa lap move will then end when a lap ends just before an empty hole.
If a player ends his stone with a point move he gets a "free turn".

Capturing 
Depending on the last hole sown in a lap, a player may capture stones from the board. The exact requirements for capture, as well as what is done with captured stones, vary considerably among games. Typically, a capture requires sowing to end in a hole with a certain number of stones, ending across the board from stones in specific configurations or landing in an empty hole adjacent to an opponent's hole that contains one or more pieces.

Another common way of capturing is to capture the stones that reach a certain number of seeds at any moment.

Also, several games include the notion of capturing holes, and thus all seeds sown on a captured hole belong at the end of the game to the player who captured it.

Psychology 
Like other board games, mancala games have led to psychological studies. Retschitzki has studied the cognitive processes used by awalé players. Some of Restchitzki's results on memory and problem solving have recently been simulated by Fernand Gobet with the CHREST computer model. De Voogt has studied the psychology of Bao playing.

In popular culture 
Mancala was mentioned in the film I Heart Huckabees and used as a minigame in the multiplayer online game Club Penguin. It is also one of the games featured in Nintendo's Clubhouse Games: 51 Worldwide Classics. Mancala was also used as a minigame as a part of the "Nabooti" island adventure on Poptropica. Mancala also features in 2019 Ethiopian board video game Gebeta released by Qene Technology. Mancala is also featured on the GamePigeon app for iOS devices, which allows users to play games with their contacts via iMessage.

See also 
Abstract strategy games
Tak

 List of mancala games

References

Further reading

 
 
 
 
 Deledicq, A. & A. Popova (1977). Wari et solo. Le jeu de calcul Africain. Paris: Cedic.
 Murray, H.J.R. (1952). A History of Board-Games other than Chess. Oxford at the Clarendon Press.
 
 Voogt, A.J. de (1997). Mancala Board Games. British Museum Press: London.

 
Traditional board games